The Mercedes-Benz GLB (model code X247) is a compact luxury crossover SUV produced by Mercedes-Benz. It was unveiled by the German manufacturer Daimler AG on 10 June 2019 in Park City, Utah. It was previously unveiled as a concept car to the public at the Shanghai Auto Show in April 2019.

The GLB is positioned between the GLA and the larger GLC in size, however unlike these vehicles the GLB is equipped with optional third row seating due to better space distribution. The launch date for taking orders began in July 2019. The production commenced at the end of 2019 for the 2020 model year.

Overview 
The GLB uses the same front-wheel-drive MFA2 platform as the W177 A-Class and the H247 GLA, but the wheelbase is  longer to give it extra practicality. Mechanically, it has standard all-wheel-drive and an eight-speed dual clutch automatic transmission, and shares its engine lineup with the A-Class.

The model adopts a square, angular style inspired by the larger X167 GLS and the former boxy shaped X204 GLK-Class. It features a MacPherson strut front and multi-link rear suspension with optional adaptive damping. Inside, the widescreen cockpit and the latest version of the MBUX interface is featured.  

The Mercedes-AMG GLB 35 4MATIC was announced on 28 August 2019 in time for the 2019 IAA Frankfurt Auto Show. The GLB 35 4MATIC is the first of the 35-series models to have an eight-speed automatic gearbox; other 35-series models (A 35 4MATIC and CLA 35 4MATIC) continue with seven-speed automatic gearboxes. Fitted to GLB 35 4MATIC, the AMG-specific Panamericana Grille is used on the 35-series model for the first time.

Technical details
It is available with 4-cylinder petrol and diesel engines only, while a plug-in hybrid and a fully electric version, called the EQB, was unveiled in April 2021.

Engines
At launch, the GLB came with two petrol and two diesel engines. All of them are fitted with automatic transmissions only, while 4MATIC all-wheel-drive system is either available or standard with the 2.0-litre engines, only.

Diesel engines and the smaller petrol engine were eschewed for the US market, leaving only the 2.0-litre 4-cylinder turbo of the GLB 250 for the debut.

Transmissions

Sales

References

GLB
Cars introduced in 2019
2020s cars
Compact sport utility vehicles
Luxury crossover sport utility vehicles
Front-wheel-drive vehicles
All-wheel-drive vehicles